Michael Owens may refer to:
 Michael Owens (cricketer) (born 1969), former cricketer from New Zealand
 Michael Owens (Medal of Honor) (1837–1890), U.S. Marine who was awarded the Medal of Honor for actions during the Korean Expedition of 1871
 Michael Joseph Owens (1859–1923), glassmaker who invented many processes for making glass containers
 Michael Owens (visual effects artist), American assistant director and visual effects artist
 Michael Owens (footballer) (born 2003), Peruvian footballer

See also
 Michael Owen (disambiguation)